Julie A. Nelson (born 1956) is an emeritus professor of economics at the University of Massachusetts Boston, most known for her application of feminist theory to questions of the definition of the discipline of economics, and its models and methodology. Nelson received her Ph.D. degree in economics from the University of Wisconsin–Madison. Her work focuses on gender and economics, philosophy and methodology of economics, ecological economics, and quantitative methods. Nelson is among the founders and the most highly cited scholars in the field of feminist economics.

Education 
Nelson graduated from St. Olaf College with a B.A. in economics in 1978.  Nelson earned a M.A. in economics from the University of Wisconsin-Madison in 1982. In 1986, Nelson also received a Ph. D. from the University of Wisconsin-Madison.

Career 
Beyond Economic Man: Feminist Theory and Economics, a 1993 book Nelson co-edited with Marianne A. Ferber,  has been called a 'landmark'  and the 'manifesto' of feminist economics. A follow-up volume, Feminist Economics Today, summarizes the development of the field over the following ten years   Nelson is author, co-author, or editor of numerous academic articles and books on both feminist theory and the empirical study of behavior, as well as a co-author of the "in Context" series of economics textbooks. 

Her 2006 book (2nd edition, 2018) Economics for Humans dismisses the view that markets are inexorable "machines" and discusses how a better understanding of the relation of economics and values could improve both business and care work. She argues that the current approach to studying the economy as though it were an asocial   machine, using only tools that emphasize 'detachment, mathematical reasoning, formality and abstraction', is narrow and damaging. She suggests that the metaphor of a "beating heart" would better frame discussions about the economy in terms of values. Other recent work addresses issues of ethics and economics, and particularly in relation to climate change, and how stereotypes about women have distorted recent behavioral economics research. 

Nelson was a founding member of the International Association for Feminist Economics, an associate editor of the journal Feminist Economics, the 2019 President of the Association for Social Economics, and is the Economics Section editor of the Journal of Business Ethics. Nelson started her career at the United States Bureau of Labor Statistics, subsequently became a tenured associate professor at the University of California, Davis, and then moved to the Boston, Massachusetts area, where she was professor of economics at the University of Massachusetts Boston and a senior research fellow with the Global Development and Environment Institute.

Selected bibliography

Books 
 
 
 
Reviewed by

Book chapters

Journal articles 
 
 
  Pdf.

See also 
 Feminist economics
 List of feminist economists

References

External links 
 Julie Nelson’s website
 Julie A. Nelson, University of Massachusetts Boston

21st-century American economists
American feminists
American women economists
Feminist economists
1956 births
Living people
University of Wisconsin–Madison College of Letters and Science alumni
21st-century American women